The district of Bomst was a Prussian district which existed from 1793 to 1807 in the province of South Prussia and from 1815 to 1938 successively in the Grand Duchy of Posen, the Province of Posen and the Frontier March of Posen-West Prussia. The district capital was Wollstein.

History 
After the Second Partition of Poland in 1793, the area around the towns of Bomst and Wollstein formed the Bomst district in the Prussian province of South Prussia. Through the Treaties of Tilsit, the Bomst district became part of the Duchy of Warsaw in 1807. After the Congress of Vienna, the district became part of the Grand Duchy of Posen in 1815, which became the Prussian Province of Posen in 1848. The province of Posen belonged to the newly founded German Empire from January 18, 1871.

In the course of district reforms, on January 1, 1818, the Bomst district ceded the area around the town of Neutomischel to the Buk district and the area around the town of Bentschen to the Meseritz district. In return, it received the area around Priment from the Fraustadt district.

On December 27, 1918, the Greater Poland uprising began in the province of Posen, and by the beginning of January 1919 the eastern part of the Bomst district was under Polish control. On February 16, 1919, an armistice ended the Polish-German fighting, and on June 28, 1919, with the signing of the Treaty of Versailles, the German government officially ceded the eastern two-thirds of the Bomst district to Poland. The western part of the Bomst district remained in Germany and became part of the Frontier March of Posen-West Prussia.

On October 1, 1938, the Bomst district was dissolved. The northern part of the district with the towns of Bomst and Unruhstadt was transferred to the district of Züllichau-Schwiebus in the Province of Brandenburg, while the southern part of the district was transferred to the district of Grünberg in the Province of Lower Silesia.

Demographics 
The Bomst district had a mixed population of Germans and Poles. The population of the district was almost evenly split between Germans and Poles. After the border change in 1919, in the part of the district that remained in Germany, there was a substantial Polish minority of 20.6% according to the 1925 census.

Elections 
The Bomst district together with the Meseritz district formed the Posen 3 parliamentary constituency. In the Reichstag elections of the German Empire between 1871 and 1912, the following members were elected:

 1871: Hans Wilhelm von Unruhe-Bomst, Free Conservative Party
 1874: Hans Wilhelm von Unruhe-Bomst, Free Conservative Party
 1877: Hans Wilhelm von Unruhe-Bomst, Free Conservative Party
 1878: Hans Wilhelm von Unruhe-Bomst, Free Conservative Party
 1881: Hans Wilhelm von Unruhe-Bomst, Free Conservative Party
 1884: Hans Wilhelm von Unruhe-Bomst, Free Conservative Party
 1887: Hans Wilhelm von Unruhe-Bomst, Free Conservative Party
 1890: Hans Wilhelm von Unruhe-Bomst, Free Conservative Party
 1893: Hans Wilhelm von Unruhe-Bomst, Free Conservative Party
 1898: Stephan von Dziembowski-Bomst, Free Conservative Party
 1903: Hans Otto von Gersdorff, German Conservative Party
 1907: Hans Otto von Gersdorff, German Conservative Party
 1912: Kuno von Westarp, German Conservative Party

References 

Districts of the Province of Posen
Zielona Góra County
Wolsztyn County
1793 establishments in Prussia
1938 disestablishments in Germany